Mauvin Borges (born 18 March 1995) is an Indian professional footballer who plays as a striker for Sporting Clube de Goa in the I-League.

Career

Youth
Born in Nuvem, Goa, Mauvin started his youth career with SESA F.A. He was the captain for the Goa U-16 football team in the 2009 Mir Iqbal Hussain Trophy which was held in Pune.

He was also the captain for the Goa U-19 team at 2011 B.C. Roy Trophy which was held in Siliguri, West Bengal from 18 January to 29th 2012.

In 2013, he was felicitated for being the most promising U-20 player by GFA when he was with Sesa FA.

Sporting Goa
Borges made his professional debut for Sporting Goa in the I-League on 29 September 2013 against Prayag United S.C. at the Kalyani Stadium in which he came on as a substitute for Victorino Fernandes in the 69th minute; as Sporting Goa lost the match 3–1.

Career statistics

References

External links 
 I-League Profile
 Goal Profile

1995 births
Living people
People from South Goa district
Indian footballers
Sporting Clube de Goa players
Footballers from Goa
I-League players
Association football forwards